The 1959 All-Eastern football team consists of American football players chosen by various selectors as the best players at each position among the Eastern colleges and universities during the 1959 NCAA University Division football season. 

The undefeated 1959 Syracuse Orangemen football team was ranked No. 1 in the final AP Poll and Coaches Poll. Four Syracuse players were named to the first team by the UPI, including backs Ernie Davis and Gerhard Schwedes, tackle Bob Yates, and guard Roger Davis.

Backs 
 Richie Lucas, Penn State (UPI-1)
 Chester Boulris, Harvard (UPI-1)
 Ernie Davis, Syracuse (UPI-1)
 Gerhard Schwedes, Syracuse (UPI-1)

Ends 
 Bill Carpenter, Army (UPI-1)
 Mike Ditka, Pittsburgh (UPI-1)

Tackles 
 Bob Yates, Syracuse (UPI-1)
 Andy Stynchula, Penn State (UPI-1)

Guards 
 Roger Davis, Syracuse (UPI-1)
 Larry Vignali, Pittsburgh (UPI-1)

Center 
 Roger LeClerc, Trinity (CT) (UPI-1)

Key
 AP = Associated Press
 UPI = United Press International

See also
 1959 College Football All-America Team

References

All-Eastern
All-Eastern college football teams